Tracey Ann Atkin (born 14 August 1971) is a female retired British swimmer. Atkin competed in two events at the 1988 Summer Olympics. At the ASA National British Championships she won the 400 metres medley title in 1988.

References

External links
 

1971 births
Living people
British female swimmers
Olympic swimmers of Great Britain
Swimmers at the 1988 Summer Olympics
Sportspeople from Lincoln, England
20th-century British women